In France, the versement transport (abbreviated  VT) is a hypothecated urban regional payroll tax levied on the total gross salaries of all employees of companies of more than 11 employees, originally intended to raise capital for investment in local public transport infrastructure, but more and more used to cover its operating expenses. The tax is levied on the employer, not the employee directly.

The STIF distributed the money between the Régie autonome des transports parisiens (RATP, the metropolitan transport authority), the Société nationale des chemins de fer français (SNCF, the state railway operator) and the Optile group (private companies that operate bus lines in the suburbs).

Expansion 
First established in the Paris region, in 1973 the VT was extended to all urban regions of over  people. The money is directed to the local autorité organisatrice de transport urbain.

Rates

General 
The VT rate is variable depending on the size of the population in the PTU. Since 2011, it is limited to 0.9% for PTUs with fewer than  inhabitants.

Île de France 
 2.85% in Paris and the Département of Hauts-de-Seine
 1.91% in certain municipalities, set by decree, in the Départements of Seine-Saint-Denis, Val-de-Marne, Seine-et-Marne, Yvelines, Essonne, and Val-d'Oise
 1.50% for other municipalities in Île-de-France.

Supplements 
 an AOT can set its tax at 1.75% if it provides the service itself rather than contracting it out
 Since July 2010, another 0.2% may be raised if at least one commune in the PTU Is classed as a tourist destination.

Deductions 
Employers who grow to exceed the threshold of 11 employees are exempt from paying transport tax for three years and receive a discount of 75% the fourth year, 50% the fifth year and 25% in year six.

Usage 
In the 1970s, this tax was used to modernise the public transport networks.

External links 
Source: legifrance.gouv.fr
Law:
 Statutory: Code général des collectivités territoriales, Partie législative, Deuxième partie : La commune, Livre III : Finances communales, Titre III : Recette, Chapitre III : Taxes, redevances ou versements non prévus par le code général des impôts, Section 8 : Versement destiné aux transports en commun, Articles L2333-64 à L2333-64 
 Regulatory: Code général des collectivités territoriales, Partie réglementaire, Deuxième partie : La commune, Livre III : Finances communales, Titre III : Recette, Chapitre III : Taxes, redevances ou versements non prévus par le code général des impôts, Section 8 : Versement destiné aux transports en commun, Articles D2333-83 à R2333-104-1 
 Special directives for the l'Ile de France : ,  and  

Transport law in France
Taxation in France